Brezovička is a village and municipality in Sabinov District in the Prešov Region of north-eastern Slovakia.

History

In historical records the village was first mentioned in 1320 AD.

Geography
The municipality lies at an altitude of 494 metres and covers an area of 8.985 km². It has a population of about 422 people.

Genealogical resources

The records for genealogical research are available at the state archive "Statny Archiv in Presov, Slovakia"

 Roman Catholic church records (births/marriages/deaths): 1788-1895 (parish A)

See also
 List of municipalities and towns in Slovakia

External links
https://web.archive.org/web/20071116010355/http://www.statistics.sk/mosmis/eng/run.html
Surnames of living people in Brezovicka

Villages and municipalities in Sabinov District
Šariš